Events in the year 2021 in Portugal.

Incumbents
 President: Marcelo Rebelo de Sousa 
 Prime Minister: António Costa (Socialist)

Events
Ongoing — COVID-19 pandemic in Portugal
24 January –  2021 Portuguese presidential election.
 19 April – Thousands march in Lisbon against a proposed ban of Portuguese far-right party Chega.

Deaths

1 January – Carlos do Carmo, fado singer (b. 1939).
13 May - Maria João Abreu, actress (b. 1964).
 25 July – Otelo Saraiva de Carvalho, military officer (b. 1936).

References

 
2020s in Portugal
Years of the 21st century in Portugal
Portugal
Portugal